Holtzclaw is a surname. Notable people with the surname include:

 Bill Holtzclaw (born 1964), American politician
 Daniel Holtzclaw (born 1986), American former police officer and convicted serial rapist 
 Henry J. Holtzclaw (1897–1969), United States Department of the Treasury official
 James Holtzclaw, American politician
 James T. Holtzclaw (1833–1893), American lawyer, railroad commissioner, and Confederate States Army general
 William Henry Holtzclaw, educator and founder of Utica Institute in Mississippi